B.P.T. Ground or Bombay Port Trust Trust Ground is a football stadium located in Mumbai. It is located at premises of Bombay Port Trust which was established in 1998. The stadium has a capacity of around 5,000 and was home of Bengal Mumbai FC.

References

External links 

 places.wonobo

Football in Mumbai
Sports venues in Mumbai
Football venues in Maharashtra
1998 establishments in Maharashtra
Sports venues completed in 1998
20th-century architecture in India